Afrique-sur-Seine  is a French film produced by Jacques Mélo Kane, Mamadou Sarr and Paulin Soumanou Vieyra in 1955.

One of the first short features produced by Africans, filmed in Paris in 1955, it has been called the beginning of African cinema.

Synopsis 
Denied the authorisation he needed to film in Sénégal under the Laval Decree, Viera decided to film his first short feature in Paris.  The film recounts the life of African students in Paris, their encounters and the nostalgia they felt far from their native land.

Credits 
 Title : Afrique-sur-Seine
 Production :  Jacques Mélo Kane, Mamadou Sarr, Paulin Soumanou Vieyra
 Screenplay : Mamadou Sarr

 Montage : Paulin Soumanou Vieyra
 Country of origin of producers : Bénin, France, French Guiana, Sénégal
 Production : Groupe africain de cinéma
 Language :  French 
 Format : 16 mm, black and white
 Genre : fiction
 Length : 21 minutes

Distribution 
 Marpessa Dawn
 Philippe Mory

See also 
 
 Cinema of Africa

Notes and references

External links 
 
 
 
 
 
 
 

1955 films
French short films
Cinema of Senegal
Cinema of Benin
African diaspora
French black-and-white films
1950s French films